Daniel H. Ortiz is a non affiliated member of the Alaska House of Representatives, who has since 2015 represented the 1st District (formally 36th). He is one of three non affiliated members in the Alaska State Legislature. However, he caucuses with the Democratic-led majority for purposes of committee assignments.

Ortiz was elected in November 2014 to succeed retiring Representative Peggy Wilson of Wrangell. He defeated Wilson's endorsed candidate, Republican Chere Klein, by just 104 votes.

Personal life
Dan Ortiz has a wife, Lori, and three children. He is a former schoolteacher who taught at Ketchikan High School.

References

External links

Alaska Independents
American politicians of Mexican descent
Living people
Members of the Alaska House of Representatives
People from Ketchikan, Alaska
Place of birth missing (living people)
Seattle Pacific University alumni
University of Wisconsin–Eau Claire alumni
Year of birth missing (living people)
21st-century American politicians